A distant retrograde orbit (DRO), as most commonly conceived, is a spacecraft orbit around a moon that is highly stable because of its interactions with two Lagrange points ( and ) of the planet–moon system.

In more general terms, an object of negligible mass can be in a DRO around the smaller body of any two-body system, such as planet–Sun or exoplanet–star.

Using the example of a spacecraft in a DRO around a moon, the craft would orbit in the direction opposite to the direction in which the moon orbits the planet. The orbit is "distant" in the sense that it passes above the Lagrange points, rather than being near the moon. If we consider more and more distant orbits, the synodic period (the period between two moments when the craft passes between the planet and the moon) gets longer and approaches that of the moon going around the planet, so that the sidereal period (the time it takes for the craft to come back to a given constellation as viewed from the moon) can become much longer than the orbital period of the moon. A hypothetical example with Europa has a sidereal period about eight times the orbital period of Europa.

DROs have been researched for several decades, but in 2022, NASA's Orion Spacecraft entered the orbit during the Artemis 1 mission and it was speculated that the Chang'e 5 orbiter may also have now done so.

Description 
The stability of a DRO is defined in mathematical terms as having very high Lyapunov stability, where an equilibrium orbit is "locally stable if all solutions which start near the point remain near that point for all time".

List of objects in distant retrograde orbit

Chang'e 5 orbiter

After dropping off return samples for Earth, China's Chang'e 5 (CE-5) orbiter first moved to Sun-Earth Lagrange point 1 (L1) in March 2021 for solar observations. In January 2022, CE-5 left L1 point for the lunar distant retrograde orbit (DRO) to conduct very-long-baseline interferometry tests in preparation for the next stage of China's Lunar Exploration Program. According to The Space Review (TSR), this maneuver was depicted in Chinese government and academic documents. In February 2022, Multiple amateur satellite trackers observed CE-5 had entered DRO, which was the first spacecraft in history to utilize the orbit.

Orion spacecraft 

On 16 November 2022, the Space Launch System was launched from Complex 39B as part of the Artemis 1 mission carrying Orion to the moon. On 25 November it entered DRO and orbited the Moon in that orbit.

Space concepts proposed to use a DRO

Jupiter Icy Moons Orbiter 
A distant retrograde orbit was one of the proposed orbits around Europa for the Jupiter Icy Moons Orbiter—principally for its projected stability and low-energy transfer characteristics—but that mission concept was cancelled in 2005.

Asteroid Redirect Mission (ARM) 
A distant retrograde orbit was considered to be used for the proposed Asteroid Redirect Mission. Although the mission would end up getting cancelled, the research done with DRO in-mind, lead to the orbit being used for Artemis 1.

NASA Lunar Gateway 
Two system requirements for the NASA Lunar Gateway, as published in the Baseline DSG-RQMT-001 published in June 2019, mention the use of lunar DROs. Requirement L2-GW-0029, Single Orbit Transfer, states "the Gateway shall be capable of performing a single round trip transfer to Distant Retrograde Orbit (DRO) and back within 11 months". Requirement L2-GW-0026, Propulsion System Capability, states "the Gateway shall provide a fuel capacity that would support performing a minimum of two round-trip uncrewed low-energy cislunar orbit transfers between a near-rectilinear halo orbit (NRHO) and a distant retrograde orbit (DRO) and orbit maintenance for a period of 15 years between refueling".  Although the selected orbit for the Gateway has been confirmed to be NRHO instead of DRO.

DRO orbits in fiction 

See also 
 Free-return trajectory

References 

Astrodynamics
Three-body orbits